Karlsruhe Accurate Arithmetic (KAA) or Karlsruhe Accurate Arithmetic Approach (KAAA), augments conventional floating-point arithmetic with good error behaviour with new operations to calculate scalar products with a single rounding error.

The foundations for KAA were developed at the University of Karlsruhe starting in the late 1960s.

See also
 Ulrich W. Kulisch
 
 IBM 4361
 PCS Cadmus
 FORTRAN-SC
 PASCAL-SC
 PASCAL-XSC
 C-XSC
 Extensions for Scientific Computation (XSC)
 Triplex-ALGOL Karlsruhe
 Interval arithmetic
 Unum
 Catastrophic cancellation

References

Further reading

 
 
 
 
 
 

Computer arithmetic
Numerical analysis